NFL Live (stylized as NFL Live presented by FanDuel Sportsbook for sponsorship reasons) is an American National Football League (NFL) studio show, currently airing Monday through Friday at 3:00 p.m ET on sports cable channel ESPN. Formerly known as NFL 2Night, the program is one of the few NFL-related studio programs to air during the week along with NFL Insiders. As such, NFL Live is not a highlight show, as Sunday and Monday game highlights are handled by the various other NFL studio shows, including NFL Primetime during the season. Unlike shows for other sports, NFL Live even runs throughout the entire offseason.

Since 2005, NFL Live has been presented in high definition on ESPN HD.

Beginning in 2011, NFL Live expanded to a full hour.

ESPN announced that beginning in August 2020, Laura Rutledge would assume hosting duties of the program, along with Keyshawn Johnson, Mina Kimes, Dan Orlovsky, and Marcus Spears becoming daily analysts.

Personalities

Current
Main Panelists
Laura Rutledge (2020–present): Lead host 
Marcus Spears (2019–present): Main Analyst 
Keyshawn Johnson (2007–present): Main Analyst 
Dan Orlovsky (2019–present): Main Analyst 
Mina Kimes (2020–present): Main Analyst
Ryan Clark (2015-present): Main Analyst
Contributors
Robert Griffin III (2021-present): Contributor 
Sam Acho (2021-present): Contributor 
Jeff Darlington (2017–present): Contributor
Dan Graziano (2016–present): Analyst/Contributor, Substitute host
Chris Mortensen (1998–present): NFL insider
Louis Riddick (2018–present): Contributor
Dianna Russini (2015–present): Contributor, Substitute host
Field Yates (2016–present): Analyst/Substitute Host
Adam Schefter (2009–present): Contributor/ESPN NFL Insider
Tim Hasselbeck (2008–present): Contributor
Damien Woody (2011–present): Contributor
Tedy Bruschi (2009–present): Contributor
Mike Tannenbaum (2019–present): Contributor
Rob Ninkovich (2019–present): Contributor

Former
Bonnie Bernstein (2007–2008): Substitute host; now a co-host of The Michael Kay Show on 1050 ESPN Radio in New York
Jerome Bettis (2013–2017): Analyst
Cris Carter (2008–2016): Analyst
John Clayton (1998–2017): NFL insider
Brian Dawkins (2012–2015): Analyst
Jack Del Rio (2019–20): Analyst; now defensive coordinator of the Washington Commanders
Trent Dilfer (2008–2017): Analyst
Herm Edwards (2009–2017): Analyst; Now head coach at Arizona State
Mike Golic (1998–2020): Contributor
Mike Hill (2007–2013): Secondary host
Merril Hoge (1998–2017): Analyst
Tom Jackson (2006–2016): Analyst
Shaun King (2007–2008): Analyst
Eric Mangini (2011–2012): Analyst
Josh McCown (2019): Analyst; now Philadelphia Eagles emergency quarterback
Wendi Nix (2008–2017): Substitute host, (2017–2020) Lead host
Antonio Pierce (2010–2014): Analyst
Bill Polian (2012–2018): Analyst
Floyd Reese (2007–2008): Analyst; left to become New England Patriots Senior Football Advisor
Sean Salisbury (1998–2008)
Jeff Saturday (2013–2022): Contributor
Mark Schlereth (2002–2017): Analyst
Rick Spielman (2005–2006): Analyst; former Minnesota Vikings General Manager
Sara Walsh (2011–2017) : Primary substitute host
Trey Wingo (1998–2017): Lead host
Darren Woodson (2007–2019): Analyst

Segments
NFL Live Wired: A segment at the beginning of the show detailing the top stories and breaking news from around the National Football League. This segment was discontinued in the summer of 2007. It eventually was re-added as an unnamed segment where the news stories of the day are listed in chronological order of their release or when an item hit the transaction wire (e.g. "10:33 a.m.: the Cincinnati Bengals placed (player name) on injured reserve").
Opening Drive: A segment following NFL Live Wired in which a certain team, player, or topic is discussed.
What Were They Thinking?: A look at dubious plays and decisions from the previous week's NFL games.
Drive of the Week: A look at the plays that comprised the best drive by a team from the previous week's NFL games.
Fantasy Five: Every week during the NFL season, Wingo, Salisbury, and Schlereth pick one player from each position (QB, RB, WR, TE, K) that they think will perform the best. One point is given for each player if he reaches a certain statistic during a game 
Off the Mark: A weekly segment where Schlereth rants about a moment at some point in time during the previous week that has grabbed his attention.
Hurry-Up Offense: A segment at the end of each show, in which analysts are given a certain amount of time to discuss various topics.
Cover 2: Analysis of various topics from two points of view: an NFL insider (which could include a sportswriter, former general manager or former director of player personnel) and a (current or former) NFL player.
Overreaction Monday: Based on the past weekend's performance, extreme topics are presented to the analysts for debate.
Film Room: Analysts break down plays in the film room

See also
 NFL Insiders

References

External links

ESPN original programming
ESPN2 original programming
American sports television series
1998 American television series debuts
2000s American television series
2010s American television series
2020s American television series
Live